George Henry Robinson (1878 – March 1945) was an English professional footballer who played as a half back for Nottingham Forest and Bradford City.

Career
Born in Basford, Robinson began his professional career with Nottingham Forest, having previously played for Notts Jardines and Newark.

He signed for Bradford City in June 1903. He played in City's first ever Football League game, against Grimsby. He was City's captain as they won the 1907–08 Second Division title, and he also played as they won the FA Cup in 1911, serving as vice-captain.

He received two benefit matches, in 1909 (alongside Jimmy Millar) and in 1914. During World War One he made one wartime appearance. When he retired from playing in 1915 he had made a then club record 343 league appearances for City. During his career he had also made a then-record 69 consecutive league appearances; that record was broken by Bruce Stowell in 1972. After the War he became a trainer at City, until June 1922.

He died in March 1945, aged 67.

Honours
Bradford City
1907–08 Football League Second Division champions
1911 FA Cup Final

Sources

References

1878 births
1945 deaths
People from Basford, Nottinghamshire
Footballers from Nottinghamshire
English footballers
Newark F.C. players
Nottingham Forest F.C. players
Bradford City A.F.C. players
English Football League players
Association football defenders
Bradford City A.F.C. non-playing staff
FA Cup Final players